Efton J. Reid III (born February 3, 2002) is an American college basketball player for the Gonzaga Bulldogs of the West Coast Conference. He previously played for the LSU Tigers.

High school career
Reid played basketball for Steward School in Richmond, Virginia, where he emerged as a top college prospect by his sophomore season. As a junior, he averaged 19 points, 12 rebounds and two blocks per game, shooting 74.6 percent from the field, and earned First Team VISAA Division II All-State honors. For his senior season, he transferred to IMG Academy in Bradenton, Florida, joining the postgraduate team. Reid averaged 16 points and 11 rebounds as a senior. He was named to the Jordan Brand Classic roster.

Recruiting
Reid was considered a five-star recruit by ESPN and Rivals, and a four-star recruit by 247Sports. On May 9, 2021, he committed to playing college basketball for LSU over offers from Florida State, Ohio State and Pittsburgh.

Career statistics

College

|-
| style="text-align:left;"| 2021–22
| style="text-align:left;"| LSU
| 34 || 34 || 19.6 || .519 || .250 || .483 || 4.3 || .5 || .5 || .8 || 6.3

References

External links
LSU Tigers bio
USA Basketball bio

2002 births
Living people
American men's basketball players
Basketball players from Richmond, Virginia
Centers (basketball)
Gonzaga Bulldogs men's basketball players
IMG Academy alumni
LSU Tigers basketball players